Stanly County Airport  is a county-owned, joint civil-military, public-use airport in Stanly County, North Carolina, United States. It is located four nautical miles (5 mi, 7 km) northeast of the central business district of Albemarle, North Carolina. This airport is included in the National Plan of Integrated Airport Systems for 2011–2015, which categorized it as a general aviation facility.

Although most U.S. airports use the same three-letter location identifier for the FAA and IATA, this airport is assigned VUJ by the FAA but has no assignment from the IATA. The airport's ICAO identifier is KVUJ.

Stanly County Air National Guard Station 
Stanly County Airport serves as a regional training site for the North Carolina Air National Guard.  The 235th Air Traffic Control Squadron (235 ATCS) operates the control tower at the airport.  Also located at the airport's Air National Guard Station are the 118th Air Support Operations Squadron (118 ASOS), 156th Weather Flight (156 WF) and the 263d Combat Communications Squadron (263 CCS).  Runway 4R/22L was frequently used as an assault strip by the C-130s of the North Carolina Air National Guard's 145th Airlift Wing (145 AW) based in Charlotte; that unit is now transitioning to the C-17 Globemaster III.

Facilities and aircraft 
Stanly County Airport covers an area of 800 acres (324 ha) at an elevation of 609 feet (186 m) above mean sea level. It has two runways with asphalt surfaces:4R/22L is 5,500 by 100 feet (1,676 x 30 m) and 4L/22R is 3,500 by 75 feet (1,067 x 23 m).

For the 12-month period ending July 22, 2011, the airport had 22,042 aircraft operations, an average of 60 per day: 77% general aviation and 23% military. At that time there were 18 aircraft based at this airport: 89% single-engine and 11% multi-engine.

References

External links 
 
  at North Carolina DOT airport guide
 Aerial image as of March 1998 from USGS The National Map
 
 

Airports in North Carolina
Transportation in Stanly County, North Carolina
Buildings and structures in Stanly County, North Carolina
Installations of the United States Air National Guard
General aviation
County airports in the United States